Regional Congress may refer to:
Congress of Local and Regional Authorities, an assembly of the Council of Europe
Mumbai Regional Congress Committee, a unit of the Indian National Congress in Mumbai
Regional Congress of Peasants, Workers and Insurgents, the principle authority of the Makhnovshchina